James Van Gundia Neel (March 22, 1915 – February 1, 2000) was an American geneticist who played a key role in the development of human genetics as a field of research in the United States. He made important contributions to the emergence of genetic epidemiology and pursued an understanding of the influence of environment on genes. In his early work, he studied sickle-cell disease and thalassemia conducted research on the effects of radiation on survivors of the Hiroshima atomic bombing.

Life
Neel attended the College of Wooster with a degree in biology in 1935 and went on to receive his Ph.D. at the University of Rochester.

In 1956, Neel established the University of Michigan Department of Genetics, the first department of human genetics at a medical school in the United States. He was elected a Fellow of the American Academy of Arts and Sciences in 1971.

Neel developed the "thrifty gene hypothesis" that paleolithic humans, facing long periods of hunger punctuated by brief periods of food surplus, would have adapted genetically by processing fats and carbohydrates more efficiently during feast periods, to be physiologically resilient during periods of famine. Neel believed that this genetic adaptation might have created a predisposition to type 2 diabetes mellitus. This theory was later discredited by research conducted by Neel himself.

Of particular interest to Neel was an understanding of the human genome in an evolutionary light, a concept he addressed in his fieldwork with cultural anthropologist Napoleon Chagnon among the Yanomamo and Xavante in Brazil and Venezuela. His involvement in this fieldwork came under scrutiny in the Darkness in El Dorado controversy, a scandal in anthropology that broke in 2000 involving numerous allegations of unethical research that threatened serious damage to Neel's reputation. The accusation is that Neel deliberately injected South American natives with virulent measles vaccine to spark off an epidemic which killed hundreds and probably thousands. However, these claims against him were never substantiated with any evidence, and it was found later that the measles outbreak predated his arrival. The majority of the allegations in Darkness in El Dorado have since been found to have been fabricated by the author.

Organizations
Neel was concerned with nuclear fallout and radiation damage. He was active in the Atomic Bomb Casualty Commission and the Radiation Effects Research Foundation. He testified several times before committees and sub-committees of the United States Congress as an expert witness regarding the long-term effects of radiation on human populations.

He was also involved with the American Academy of Arts and Sciences, the American Philosophical Society, the National Research Council, the Pan-American Health Organization, and the World Health Organization.

Awards
 1960 Albert Lasker Award for Basic Medical Research
 1965 William Allan Award
 1974 National Medal of Science

Works
 1949: "The Inheritance of Sickle Cell Anemia", Science 110: 64-66.
 1967: "The Web of History and the Web of Life: Atomic Bombs, Inbreeding and Japanese Genes", Michigan Quarterly Review 6:202-209.
 1994: Physician to the Gene Pool: Genetic Lessons and Other Stories, New York: John Wiley and Sons.

References

External links
 James V. Neel, M.D., Ph.D. (March 22, 1915–January 31, 2000): Founder Effect
 James V. Neel, U-M Professor and Father of Modern Human Genetics, Died Feb. 1 At Age 84
 James F. Crow (2002) James V. Neel, Proceedings of the American Philosophical Society 146(1)
 Key Participants: James V. Neel - It's in the Blood!  A Documentary History of Linus Pauling, Hemoglobin, and Sickle Cell Anemia at Oregon State University
 James V. Neel Is Dead at 84; Leading Genetics Researcher, The New York Times
 
 James V. Neel Papers at American Philosophical Society

American geneticists
1915 births
2000 deaths
Fellows of the American Academy of Arts and Sciences
Members of the American Philosophical Society
National Medal of Science laureates
Recipients of the Albert Lasker Award for Basic Medical Research
College of Wooster alumni
University of Rochester alumni
University of Michigan faculty
People from Hamilton, Ohio
Scientists from Michigan
20th-century American scientists
Members of the National Academy of Medicine